Chalk Flora Nature Reserve (also: Cretaceous Flora) is a protected nature reserve of Ukraine that lies on open chalk slopes of the riverine hills along the Donets River.   The reserve is in the administrative Lyman and Sloviansk districts of Donetsk Oblast.  it is a sub-unit of the Ukrainian Steppe Nature Reserve, with an area of 1,134 hectares.

Topography
The ridge is about 50-70 meters above the surrounding territory, and steep - up to 70 degrees.  The area has been preserved in large part because the land is not suitable for agriculture.

Climate and ecoregion
The climate of Chalk Flora NR is Humid continental climate, warm summer (Köppen climate classification (Dfb)).

Flora and fauna
About a third of the reserve territory is forest, surrounded by steppe.  The forests are typically of chalk pine or birch.  The steppe is of the multi-grass variety found in the mid-Ukrainian regions, on chalky soils and sow-hummus black soils.

Public use
As a strict nature reserve, Chalk Flora's primary purpose is protection of nature and scientific study.  Public access is prohibited.

See also
 Lists of Nature Preserves of Ukraine (class Ia protected areas)
 National Parks of Ukraine (class II protected areas)

References

External links
 Boundaries of Chalk Flora Nature Reserve on OpenStreetMap.org 

Protected areas of Ukraine
Nature reserves in Ukraine